4-Methyl-1-pentene is used as a monomer for olefin polymerisation.  The resulting polymer is poly(4-methyl-1-pentene).

References

Alkenes
Monomers